The 2021–22 St. Thomas (Minnesota) Tommies men's ice hockey season was the 98th season of play for the program, the 1st in Division I and the 1st season in the CCHA conference. The Tommies represented the University of St. Thomas (Minnesota) and were coached by Enrico Blasi, in his 1st season.

Season
St. Thomas began its first season at the Division I level knowing that it wasn't expected to compete with many of its new opponents. While the roster was full of transfers from other D-I programs, few had been high-level players. The Tommies began their season with a bad if unsurprising 2–12 loss to the defending national runner-up, St. Cloud State. The second game, however, was much better; even though it was a loss, it was a much closer affair and demonstrated that St. Thomas could at least rise to the level of play.

While the Tommies started the season 0–7, there were a few close games and the team finally broke through with its first D-I win in late October. After the victory, the St. Thomas offense went dormant for several months, scoring more than 2 goals on just one occasion until mid-January. The 15-game losing streak that resulted made it very difficult for St. Thomas to do anything but finish last in the CCHA standings.

The scoring picked up slightly in the later part of the season, and the Tommies were able to get two more wins before the season was out, but it was hardly a shock when St. Thomas was ranked as the worst team at the Division I level by season's end.

Departures

Recruiting

Roster
As of September 9, 2021.

Standings

Schedule and results

|-
!colspan=12 style=";" | Regular Season

|-
!colspan=12 style=";" | 

|- align="center" bgcolor="#e0e0e0"
|colspan=12|St. Thomas Lost Series 0–2

Scoring statistics

Goaltending statistics

Rankings

Note: USCHO did not release a poll in week 24.

References

2021–22
St. Thomas (Minnesota) Tommies
St. Thomas (Minnesota) Tommies
2021 in sports in Minnesota
2022 in sports in Minnesota